Zeynep Yetgil (born October 10, 2000) is a Turkish freestyle wrestler competing in the 53 kg division. She is a member of Istanbul BB SK.

Sports career
Zeynep Yetgil wins bronze medal at the Junior Wrestling World Championships. Competing in women's 48 kg at the 2017 Junior Wrestling World Championships, held in Finland, Zeynep Yetgil won bronze medal after beating her Tunisian opponent Sarra Hamdi 8–6.

2018 Junior European Wrestling Championships in Rome, Italy.Competing in women's 53 kg category, Zeynep Yetgil defeated her Azerbaijani opponent Tatyana Varansova and won the title.

In November 2021, she won one of the bronze medals in the 53 kg event at the 2021 U23 World Wrestling Championships held in Belgrade, Serbia.

She won one of the bronze medals in the 55 kg event at the 2022 European U23 Wrestling Championship held in Plovdiv, Bulgaria. A few months later, she won the silver medal in the 53 kg event at the 2022 Mediterranean Games held in Oran, Algeria. A few months later, she won the gold medal in the 55 kg event at the 2021 Islamic Solidarity Games held in Konya, Türkiye. She competed in the 53kg event at the 2022 World Wrestling Championships held in Belgrade, Serbia.

She won the gold medal in her event at the 2023 European U23 Wrestling Championships held in Bucharest, Romania.

References

External links 
 

Living people
2000 births
People from Erzurum
Turkish female sport wrestlers
Wrestlers at the 2019 European Games
European Games competitors for Turkey
Competitors at the 2022 Mediterranean Games
Mediterranean Games silver medalists for Turkey
Mediterranean Games medalists in wrestling
21st-century Turkish women
Islamic Solidarity Games competitors for Turkey
Islamic Solidarity Games medalists in wrestling